iTunes Originals is the first compilation album by South African rock band Seether. It was released exclusively through iTunes on 5 August 2008. It contains seven tracks exclusively recorded for the release at Groovemaster Studios, most of which are acoustic. It has a short interview track between each song track. It has six additional tracks from other albums. The "Tied My Hands" live track is from the One Cold Night live album. Also "He Was the Number One Fan [Interview]" is about the tragic suicide of Shaun's brother.

Track listing

Personnel 
 Shaun Morgan – lead vocals, rhythm guitar
 Dale Stewart – bass, backing vocals
 John Humphrey – drums
 Troy McLawhorn – lead guitar, backing vocals

References

2008 compilation albums
Seether
Seether albums